This is list of railway companies in India.

Current railway companies

• Indian Railways (Government Undertaking)

Former railway companies

Ahmedabad–Dholka Railway
Ahmedabad–Prantij Railway
Alnavar–Dandeli Railway
Amraoti State Railway
Amritsar–Patti Railway
Assam Behar Railway
Assam Bengal Railway
Assam Railways and Trading Company
Assam Railway
Assam Railway Link Project
Bahawalpur Royal Railway
Barharwa–Azimganj–Katwa Railway
Baria State Railway
Barsi Light Railway
Barun–Daltonganj Railway
Bengal and North Western Railway
Bengal and Assam Railway
Bengal Central Railway
Bengal Dooars Railway
Bengal Provincial Railway
Bengal Nagpur Railway
Bezwada Extension Railway
Bhagalpur Badli Railway
Bhavnagar State Railway
Bhavnagar Tramway
Bhopal State Railway
Bikaner State Railway
Bilaspur–Etawa Provincial State Railway
Bina–Goona–Baran Railway
Birur–Shimoga Railway
Bombay Port Trust Railway
Bombay, Agra and Delhi Railway
Bombay, Baroda and Central India Railway
Bowringpet–Chikballapur Railway
Brihanmumbai Electric Supply and Transport
Calcutta Chord Railway
Calcutta Port Commissioners' Railway
Calcutta Tramways Company
Carnatic Railway
Cawnpore Tramways and General Electric Works
Cawnpore–Barabanki Railway
Central Indian Coalfields Railway
Central Provinces Railway
Central Salsette Tramway
Chaparmukh Silghat Railway
Cherra Companyganj State Railways
Chickjajur–Chitaldrug Railway
Chikballapur–Bangalore City Railway
Cooch Behar State Railway
Cutch State Railway
Dacca State Railway
Dandot Light Railway
Darbhanga State Railway
Darjeeling Himalayan Railway
Daund–Baramati Railway
Dehri Rohtas Light Railway
Delhi Electric Tramways and Lighting Company
Delhi Railway
Delhi–Umballa–Kalka Railway
Deoghur Railway
Dhampur–Sherkot Tramway
Dholka–Dhandhuka Railway
Dholpur State Railway
Dhond–Manmad State Railway
Dhrangadra Railway
Dibru–Sadiya Railway
Drangdhara State Railway
East Bengal State Railway
East Coast State Railway
East India Tramway Company
East Indian Railway
Eastern Bengal Railway
Eastern Punjab Railway
Gaekwar's Baroda State Railway
Gaekwar's Dabhoi Railway
Gaekwar's Mehsana Railway
Godhra–Rutlam–Nagda Railway
Gondal State Railway
Gondia Chanda Railway
Great Indian Peninsula Railway
Great Southern of India Railway
Guntakal–Mysore Frontier Railway
Guzerat Railway Company
Gwalior Light Railway
Hardwar–Dehra Railway
Hindupur–Yesvantpur Railway
Holkar State Railway
Hooghly Katwa Railway
Hospet Kottur Railway
Hyderabad–Jodhpur Railway
Indian Branch Railway
Indian Government Railway
Indian Midland Railway
Indian Mill and Railway Company
Indus Flotilla Railway
Indus Valley State Railway
Jaipur State Railway
Jamnagar and Dwarka Railway
Jessore–Jhenidah Light Railway
Jetalsar–Rajkot Railway
Jhansi–Manikpore State Railway
Jind–Panipat Railway
Jodhpur–Bikaner Railway
Jodhpur State Railway
Jorhat State Railway
Jubbulpore Gondia Extension Railway
Junagadh State Railway
Kalka–Shimla Railway
Kandla Port Railway
Kandhar State Railway
Kangra Valley Railway
Karaikkal–Peralam Railway
Katakhal Lalbazar Railway
Kathiawar State Railway
Katni–Umaria Provincial State Railway
Kaunia–Dharlla State Railway
Kaunia–Kurigram Railway
Khamgaon State Railway
Khanai–Hindubagh Railway
Khijadiya–Dhari Railway
Khulna–Bagerhat Railway
Kolar Gold Fields Railway
Kolhapur State Railway
Kundala Valley Railway
Kushalgarh–Kohat–Thal Railway
Larkana–Jacobabad Railway
Ledo and Tikak Margherita Colliery Railway
Lucknow–Bareilly State Railway
Ludhiana–Dhuri–Jakhal Railway
Madras and Southern Mahratta Railway
Madras Electric Tramways
Madras Port Trust Railways
Madras Railway
Mandra–Bhon Railway
Martin's Light Railways
Mashrak–Thawe Extension Railway
Matheran Hill Railway
Mayurbhanj State Railway
McLeod's Light Railways
Mewar State Railway
Morvi Railway
Muttra–Achnera Provincial State Railway
Muttra–Hathras Provincial State Railway
Mymensingh–Bhairab Bazar Railway
Mysore State Railway
Mysore–Arsikere Railway
Mysore–Nanjangud Railway
Nagda–Ujjain Railway
Nagpur Chhattisgarh Railway
Nagpur–Chhindwara Railway
Nainpur–Mandla Branch Railway
Nanjangud–Chamrajnagar Railway
Nasik Tramway
Nepal–Janakpur Railway
Nilgiri Mountain Railway
Nizam's Guaranteed State Railway
Noakhali Railway
North Western State Railway
Northeast Frontier Railways
Nowshera–Durgai Railway
Okhamandal State Railway
Oudh and Rohilkhand Railway
Oudh and Tirhut Railway
Oudh State Railway
Pachora Jamner Railway
Palanpur–Deesa Railway
Panposh–Raipura Railway
Parlakimedi Light Railway
Pathankot–Mukerian Link Project
Patiala State Monorail Trainways
Patna and Gaya State Railway
Patna Tramways
Patri State Railway
Petlad–Cambay Railway
Piplod–Devgad–Baria Railway
Pondicherry Railway
Punjab Northern State Railway
Punjab Railway
Purulia Ranchi Light Railway
Raipur Dhamtari Railway
Rajkot–Beti Tramway
Rajpipla State Railway
Rajputana–Malwa Railway
Ranaghat–Krishnanagar Railway
Rohilkund and Kumaon Railway
Sangli State Railway
Santipur–Nabadwip Light Railway
Sara–Sirajgunj Railway
Satpura Railway
Saurashtra Railway
Scinde Railways
Scinde, Punjab & Delhi Railway
Scindia State Railway
Segowlie–Roxaul Railway
Shakuntala Railway
Shoranur–Cochin Railway
Sind Sagaar Railway
Sind–Pishin State Railway
South Behar Railway
South Indian Railway
Southern Mahratta Railway
Southern Punjab Railway
Tanjore District Board Railway
Tapti Valley Railway
Tarkessuar Railways
Tezpore–Balipara Light Railway
Tinnevelly–Quilon Railway
Tirhut Railway
Trans–Baluchistan Railway
Tumsar–Tirodi Light Railway
Udaipur–Chittorgarh Railway
Vijapur–Kalol–Kadi Railway
Visakhapatnam Port Trust Railway
Wardha State Coal Railway
West of India Portuguese Railway
Zhob Valley Railway

References

Companies
India
Rail
Railway companies of India